Koos van Gelder (19 October 1908 – 26 March 1984) was a Dutch footballer. He played in five matches for the Netherlands national football team from 1926 to 1935.

References

External links
 

1908 births
1984 deaths
Dutch footballers
Netherlands international footballers
Place of birth missing
Association footballers not categorized by position